Moja Republika is the regional anthem of Republika Srpska, an entity within Bosnia and Herzegovina. It was written and composed by Mladen Matović and replaced the previous regional anthem Bože pravde, which was declared unconstitutional by the Constitutional Court of Bosnia and Herzegovina in 2006.

History
During the selection process for a new regional anthem in 2008, Bosnian national anthem composer Dušan Šestić along with fellow Bosnian musician Benjamin Isović submitted an entry called "Мајко земљо" as a contender, though ultimately it was not chosen.

On 16 July 2008 "Moja Republika" replaced the previous regional anthem "Bože pravde", which was declared unconstitutional by the Constitutional Court of Bosnia and Herzegovina in 2006.

Lyrics

References

External links
 The portal Banja Luka Live has an article about "Moja Republika"
 The Republika Srpska Internet Portal has a page with lyrics and a sound file.

Culture of Republika Srpska
Politics of Republika Srpska
European anthems
2012 establishments in Bosnia and Herzegovina
Regional songs
National anthem compositions in E major